Afterhyperpolarization, or AHP, is the hyperpolarizing phase of a neuron's action potential where the cell's membrane potential falls below the normal resting potential.  This is also commonly referred to as an action potential's undershoot phase. AHPs have been segregated into "fast", "medium", and "slow" components that appear to have distinct ionic mechanisms and durations. While fast and medium AHPs can be generated by single action potentials, slow AHPs generally develop only during trains of multiple action potentials.

During single action potentials, transient depolarization of the membrane opens more voltage-gated K+ channels than are open in the resting state, many of which do not close immediately when the membrane returns to its normal resting voltage. This can lead to an "undershoot" of the membrane potential to values that are more polarized ("hyperpolarized") than was the original resting membrane potential. Ca2+-activated K+ channels that open in response to the influx of Ca2+ during the action potential carry much of the K+ current as the membrane potential becomes more negative. The K+ permeability of the membrane is transiently unusually high, driving the membrane voltage VM even closer to the K+ equilibrium voltage EK. Hence, hyperpolarization persists until the membrane K+ permeability returns to its usual value.

Medium and slow AHP currents also occur in neurons. The ionic mechanisms underlying medium and slow AHPs are not yet well understood, but may also involve M current and HCN channels for medium AHPs, and ion-dependent currents and/or ionic pumps for slow AHPs.

The afterhyperpolarized (sAHP) state can be followed by an afterdepolarized state (which is not to be confused with the cardiac afterdepolarization) and can thus set the phase of the subthreshold oscillation of the membrane potential, as reported for the stellate cells of the entorhinal cortex. This mechanism is proposed to be functionally important to maintain the spiking of these neurons at a defined phase of the theta cycle, that, in turn, is thought to contribute to encoding of new memories by the medial temporal lobe of the brain

References

Electrophysiology
Electrochemistry
Cellular processes
Membrane biology
Cellular neuroscience